Đồng Tâm is a rural commune belonging to Mỹ Đức, Hà Nội, Việt Nam.

Geography-Administration
It borders Chương Mỹ district to the north, the communes xã Phúc Lâm and Vĩnh Xương to the east, Hòa Bình Province to the west, and commune Thượng Lâm to the south.

The population is about 8,647 people, with 2,572 families. The  municipality has two villages, Hoành and  Đồng Mít, both together divided into 14 hamlets.

References

See also
2017 Hanoi hostage crisis

Communes of Hanoi